Sergeants 3 is a 1962 American comedy/Western film directed by John Sturges and starring Rat Pack icons Frank Sinatra, Dean Martin, Sammy Davis Jr., Peter Lawford and Joey Bishop. It was the last film to feature all five members of the Rat Pack, as Sinatra would no longer speak to or work with Lawford following the abrupt cancellation in March 1962 of a visit by Lawford's brother-in-law, President John F. Kennedy, to Sinatra's Palm Springs house (Kennedy opted to stay at Bing Crosby's estate instead).

The film is a remake of Gunga Din (1939), with the setting moved from India to the American West.

Plot
Mike, Chip and Larry are three lusty, brawling U.S. Cavalry sergeants stationed in Indian Territory in 1870. Mike and Chip are determined to prevent Larry from carrying out his decision to leave the army at the end of his current hitch and marry the beautiful Amelia Parent.

One night, the three friends befriend a trumpet-playing former slave, Jonah Williams, who dreams of someday becoming a trooper. A tribe of fanatical Indians begins terrorizing the area, and the headstrong Chip decides to attempt the capture of their leader. Accompanied by Jonah, he sneaks into the Indians' secret meeting place while they are conducting one of their mysterious rites, but he is discovered and taken prisoner.

Jonah escapes and races back to tell Mike and Larry. When Larry insists upon going to Chip's rescue, Mike makes him sign a reenlistment paper "just to make his help official" and promises to destroy the paper after the mission.

Mike, Larry and Jonah make their way to the Indian stronghold, but they too end up as prisoners. As the Cavalry rides into a trap where a thousand warriors are waiting to ambush them, Jonah blows the regiment's favorite tune on his trumpet as a warning. The ensuing battle ends in victory for the Cavalry; the three sergeants are decorated, and Jonah is made a trooper.

Thinking himself discharged, Larry drives off in a buggy with Amelia, but the crafty Mike shows the post's commanding officer the reenlistment paper that he had promised to destroy. It appears that Larry will be forced to serve another hitch with Mike and Chip.

Cast
 Frank Sinatra as First Sergeant Mike Merry
 Dean Martin as Sergeant Chip Deal
 Sammy Davis Jr. as Jonah Williams
 Peter Lawford as Sergeant Larry Barrett
 Joey Bishop as Sergeant-Major Roger Boswell
 Henry Silva as Mountain Hawk
 Ruta Lee as Amelia Parent
 Buddy Lester as Willie Sharpknife
 Phillip Crosby as Cpl. Ellis
 Dennis Crosby as Pvt. Page
 Lindsay Crosby as Pvt. Wills
 Hank Henry as Blacksmith
 Dick Simmons as Col. William Collingwood (billed as Richard Simmons)
 Michael Pate as Watanka
 Armand Alzamora as Caleb
 Richard Hale as White Eagle
 Rodd Redwing as Irregular

Production
Directed by John Sturges, written by W. R. Burnett and produced by Frank Sinatra, the film is a remake of Gunga Din with Sinatra in the Victor McLaglen role, Martin in the Cary Grant part, Lawford replacing Douglas Fairbanks, Jr. and Davis in Sam Jaffe's role. Parts of the film were shot in Johnson Canyon, Paria, Kanab and Bryce Canyon in Utah. Filming also took place in House Rock Valley, Arizona. The Thugee cult is replaced by the Ghost Dancers, with Michael Pate and Henry Silva appearing as Indians. Burnett was also credited with writing a novelization of the film.

Sinatra wanted to use the title Soldiers Three but couldn't get the rights, as the title was owned by Metro-Goldwyn-Mayer for another Gunga Din-inspired story set in India, Soldiers Three, a 1951 film based on Rudyard Kipling's story that starred David Niven, Walter Pidgeon and Stewart Granger.

John Wayne lent Sammy Davis Jr. the hat he wore in Legend of the Lost and Rio Bravo to wear in the film.

Rat Pack

Each of the Rat Pack's films contained a numeral in its title. The others were: Ocean's 11 (1960), Robin and the 7 Hoods (1964, with Joey Bishop absent and Bing Crosby replacing Peter Lawford) and 4 for Texas with Frank Sinatra, Dean Martin, Anita Ekberg and Ursula Andress as the four in the title, Charles Bronson as a villain and the Three Stooges as additional comedy relief. Sinatra said of these Rat Pack films: "Of course they're not great movies, no one could claim that... but every movie I've made through my own company has made money."

The only Rat Pack film not produced by Sinatra was Ocean's 11, which earned $4.3 million in rentals at the North American box office and was ranked by Variety as the 14th highest-earning film of 1960.

"The Lost Sinatra Film"
The film had seldom been seen after its initial run in cinemas until a DVD was released on May 13, 2008, both as a single disc and as part of a new Rat Pack box set, to commemorate the 10th anniversary of Sinatra's death.

Critical reception
Sergeants 3 was met with middling reviews on release. Variety labeled it as "warmed-over Gunga Din in a westernized version of that epic, with American-style Indians and Vegas-style soldiers of fortune. The essential differences between the two pictures, other than the obvious one of setting, is that the emphasis in Gunga was serious with a tongue-in-cheek overtone, whereas the emphasis in Sergeants is tongue-in-cheek with serious overtones."

In a contemporary New York Times review, critic A. H. Weiler wrote: "Mr. Sinatra and his loyal coterie switch from slapstick to slaughter and back again with reckless abandon. They may have found a 'home' in this peculiar kind of an 'Army' but their antics may be enough to give a discerning observer the megrims."

Box Office
According to Kinematograph Weekly the film was considered a "money maker" at the British box office in 1962.

References

External links
 
 
 
 
 Variety review

1962 films
1962 comedy films
1960s Western (genre) comedy films
American Western (genre) comedy films
Remakes of American films
Films based on works by Rudyard Kipling
Films directed by John Sturges
Films produced by Frank Sinatra
Films scored by Billy May
Films set in 1870
Films shot in Arizona
Films shot in Utah
Military humor in film
United Artists films
Western (genre) cavalry films
Western (genre) film remakes
1960s English-language films
1960s American films